Kenneth Ainsworth Ives (26 March 1934 – 6 March 2022) was a British actor turned television director with a number of 1960s and 1970s television credits.

As an actor, he appeared in the 1968 film version of The Lion in Winter as Queen Eleanor's guard, the 1971 BBC serial The Last of the Mohicans as Hawkeye, and had roles in Adam Adamant Lives!, The First Churchills, and as one of the eponymous villains in the Doctor Who story The Dominators.

In later years, he concentrated on directing, with credits for television productions of Strindberg's The Father (1985) and Harold Pinter's The Birthday Party (1987) for the BBC's Theatre Night series, as well as episodes of Poldark, Gangsters, Softly, Softly: Taskforce, All Creatures Great and Small and Secret Army.

Ives died on 6 March 2022, at the age of 87.

Filmography

References

External links

1934 births
2022 deaths
British male film actors
British male television actors
British television directors
20th-century British male actors